215th Division or 215th Infantry Division may refer to:

 215th Infantry Division (German Empire)
215th Infantry Division (Wehrmacht)
 215th Coastal Division (Italy)
215th Rifle Division (Soviet Union)